Jacob Allen "J. B." Bukauskas (born October 11, 1996) is an American professional baseball pitcher in the Seattle Mariners organization. He played college baseball for the North Carolina Tar Heels of the University of North Carolina at Chapel Hill. He has played in Major League Baseball (MLB) for the Arizona Diamondbacks.

Amateur career
Bukauskas attended Stone Bridge High School in Ashburn, Virginia. As a freshman, he helped Stone Bridge win both the regular season and district titles. On July 7, 2012, Bukauskas committed to the University of North Carolina, which he considered his "dream school." As a sophomore, he was named first-team All-Met. Bukauskas reclassified during the summer after his sophomore year in order to graduate and attend North Carolina a year early. He was named the 2014 All-Met Baseball Player of the Year after compiling a 7–0 record, striking out 88 batters, and not allowing an earned run during the season. Bukauskas finished his high school career with a 21–3 record, 264 strikeouts, and a 0.88 ERA.

Despite being expected by some to be drafted within the first two rounds of the 2014 MLB draft, Bukauskas asked every MLB team not to draft him. He was selected in the 20th round by the Arizona Diamondbacks but did not sign with the club, reaffirming his commitment to North Carolina.

In his freshman year, Bukauskas led the Tar Heels with 14 games started and was part of the weekend rotation. In 2016, he played collegiate summer baseball with the Chatham Anglers of the Cape Cod Baseball League. As a junior, after going 9–0 with a 2.02 ERA during the regular season, he was named ACC Pitcher of the Year and first-team all-American by Baseball America and Collegiate Baseball.

Professional career

Houston Astros
The Houston Astros selected Bukauskas with the 15th overall selection in the 2017 MLB draft. He signed with the Astros on July 7, 2017. He was assigned to the Gulf Coast League Astros, and after one scoreless outing for them, was promoted to the Tri-City ValleyCats where he finished the season, posting a 4.50 ERA in six innings pitched.

In 2018, Bukauskas returned to pitch in the GCL and with the ValleyCats along with pitching for the Quad Cities River Bandits, Buies Creek Astros, and the Corpus Christi Hooks, compiling a combined 4–2 record with a 2.14 ERA in 14 starts between the five teams; he missed time during the year due to injury. He returned to Corpus Christi to begin the 2019 season.

Arizona Diamondbacks
Bukauskas was traded on July 31, 2019, to the Arizona Diamondbacks (along with Corbin Martin, Seth Beer, Joshua Rojas, and cash considerations) in exchange for Zack Greinke. He was assigned to the Jackson Generals and finished the season there. Over 22 games (16 starts) between the two clubs, he went 2–5 with a 5.44 ERA. On November 20, 2020, Bukauskas was added to the 40-man roster.

On April 18, 2021, Bukauskas was promoted to the major leagues for the first time. He made his MLB debut on April 20 against the Cincinnati Reds, getting Nick Senzel to fly out as the only batter he faced.

On March 19, 2022, it was announced that Bukauskas had suffered a torn teres major muscle and would be out for months. He was activated on July 21 and optioned to the Triple-A Reno Aces.

On January 11, 2023, Bukauskas was designated for assignment following the signing of Zach Davies.

Seattle Mariners
On January 17, 2023, Bukauskas was claimed off waivers by the Seattle Mariners. On January 31, Bukauskas was designated for assignment by the Mariners following the waiver claim of Tayler Saucedo. On February 2, he cleared waivers and was outrighted to the Triple-A Tacoma Rainiers.

Pitching style
Bukauskas regularly throws a mid-90s fastball and been able to hit 100 mph with it since his last year of high school. He also has a slider that sits in the mid-80s and a changeup in his repertoire.

Personal life
Bukauskas's parents are Ken and Lynn Bukauskas. He was majoring in communications while at North Carolina. He is of Lithuanian origin.

References

External links

 University of North Carolina Bio

1996 births
Living people
All-American college baseball players
American people of Lithuanian descent
Arizona Diamondbacks players
Baseball players from Virginia
Buies Creek Astros players
Chatham Anglers players
Corpus Christi Hooks players
Gulf Coast Astros players
Jackson Generals (Southern League) players
Major League Baseball pitchers
North Carolina Tar Heels baseball players
People from Ashburn, Virginia
Reno Aces players
Quad Cities River Bandits players
Scottsdale Scorpions players
Tri-City ValleyCats players